Judge Peck may refer to:

Ebenezer Peck (1805–1881), judge of the United States Court of Claims
Hamilton S. Peck (1845–1933), judge of the Burlington, Vermont city court
James H. Peck (1790–1836), judge of the United States District Court for the District of Missouri
John Weld Peck (1874–1937), judge of the United States District Court for the Southern District of Ohio
John Weld Peck II (1913–1993), judge of the United States Court of Appeals for the Sixth Circuit
Samuel Stanley Peck (1829–1901), Ontario judge of the Haliburton County division courts

See also
Justice Peck (disambiguation)